The following lists events that happened during 1966 in the Democratic Republic of the Congo.

Incumbents
President – Mobutu Sese Seko
 Prime Minister: Léonard Mulamba

Events

Births 

 25 June – Dikembe Mutombo, basketball player

References

Sources

 

1966 in the Democratic Republic of the Congo
Democratic Republic of the Congo
Congo, Democratic Republic